The Vanna–Volga method is a mathematical tool used in finance. It is a technique for pricing first-generation exotic options in foreign exchange market (FX) derivatives.

Description
It consists of adjusting the Black–Scholes theoretical value (BSTV)
by the cost of a portfolio which hedges three main risks
associated to the volatility of the option: the Vega , the Vanna
and the Volga. 
The Vanna is the sensitivity of the Vega with respect to a change in the spot FX rate:

.

Similarly, the Volga is the sensitivity
of the Vega with respect to a change of the implied volatility
:

.

If we consider a smile volatility term structure  with ATM strike , ATM volatility , 25-Delta call/put volatilities , and where  are the 25-Delta
call/put strikes (obtained by solving the equations  and  where  denotes the
Black–Scholes Delta sensitivity) then the hedging portfolio
will be composed of the at-the-money (ATM), risk-reversal (RR) and butterfly (BF)
strategies:

with  the Black–Scholes price of a call option (similarly for the put).

The simplest formulation of the Vanna–Volga method suggests that the
Vanna–Volga price  of an exotic instrument  is
given by

where by  denotes the Black–Scholes price of the
exotic and the Greeks are calculated with ATM volatility and

These quantities represent a smile cost, namely the
difference between the price computed with/without including the
smile effect.

The rationale behind the above formulation of the Vanna-Volga price is that one can extract
the smile cost of an exotic option by measuring the
smile cost of a portfolio designed to hedge its Vanna and
Volga risks. The reason why one chooses the strategies BF and RR
to do this is because they are liquid FX instruments and they
carry mainly Volga, and respectively Vanna risks. The weighting
factors  and  represent
respectively the amount of RR needed to replicate the option's
Vanna, and the amount of BF needed to replicate the option's
Volga. The above approach ignores the small (but non-zero)
fraction of Volga carried by the RR and the small fraction of
Vanna carried by the BF. It further neglects the cost of hedging
the Vega risk. This has led to a more general formulation of the
Vanna-Volga method in which one considers that within the Black–Scholes
assumptions the exotic option's Vega, Vanna and Volga can be
replicated by the weighted sum of three instruments:

where the weightings are obtained by solving the system:

with

,
,

Given this replication, the Vanna–Volga method adjusts the BS
price of an exotic option by the smile cost of the above
weighted sum (note that the ATM smile cost is zero by
construction):

where

and

The quantities  can be interpreted as the
market prices attached to a unit amount of Vega, Vanna and Volga,
respectively. The resulting correction, however, typically turns
out to be too large. Market practitioners thus modify
 to

The Vega contribution turns out to be
several orders of magnitude smaller than the Vanna and Volga terms
in all practical situations, hence one neglects it.

as the knock-out barrier level  of an option
is gradually moved toward the spot level , the BSTV price of a
knock-out option must be a monotonically decreasing function, converging
Since the Vanna-Volga method is a
simple rule-of-thumb and not a rigorous model, there is no
guarantee that this will be a priori the case. The attenuation factors are of a different from for the Vanna or the Volga
of an instrument. This is because for barrier values close to the spot they behave differently: the Vanna becomes large while,
on the contrary, the Volga becomes small. Hence the
attenuation factors take the form:

where  represents some measure of the barrier(s)
vicinity to the spot with the features

The coefficients  are found through calibration of the model to ensure that it reproduces the vanilla smile. Good candidates for  that ensure the appropriate behaviour close to the barriers are the survival probability and the expected first exit time. Both of these quantities offer the desirable property that they vanish close to a barrier.

Survival probability
The survival probability  refers to the
probability that the spot does not touch one or more barrier
levels . For example, for a single barrier option we have

where  is the value of a no-touch option and  the discount factor between today and maturity. Similarly, for options with two barriers
the survival probability is given through the undiscounted value
of a double-no-touch option.

First-exit time
The first exit time (FET) is the minimum between: (i) the time in
the future when the spot is expected to exit a barrier zone before
maturity, and (ii) maturity, if the spot has not hit any of the
barrier levels up to maturity. That is, if we denote the FET by
 then min where
 such that  or
 where  are the 'low' vs 'high' barrier levels and
 the spot of today.

The first-exit time is the solution of the following PDE

This equation is solved backwards
in time starting from the terminal condition  where  is the time to maturity and
boundary conditions . In case of a single
The parameter  represents the risk-neutral drift of the underlying stochastic process.

References

 PDF.

Mathematical finance
Derivatives (finance)
Portfolio theories
Financial models